Markus Conrad (born 1959/60) is a German businessman, the chief executive officer (CEO) of Tchibo, a German chain of coffee retailers and cafés, with over 1000 branches, from 2006 to 2016.

Conrad studied business management and music at Hamburg University, followed by an MBA at INSEAD, Fontainebleau, France, and received a PhD in economics from Hamburg University in 1987.

Conrad joined Bain & Company in 1985, becoming a partner in 1989. From 1990 to 2005 he was CEO at Libri GmbH, a German book wholesaler.

Conrad was appointed CEO of Tchibo in 2006. In 2016, he was succeeded by Thomas Linemayr as CEO of Tchibo.

References

German chief executives
Living people
Year of birth uncertain
Year of birth missing (living people)